John Yiannis Bouzalas (Ιωαννης Μπουζαλας) (born September 12, 1982) is a Greek professional poker player who has twice won first place in Greek Poker Tournaments and once in the Greek Poker Championship among other notable performances. His name is often spelled as Ioannis or Yiannis / Giannis Mpouzalas.

Poker career 
Bouzalas has won three major poker tournaments:

 5th Greek Poker Tournament   - 1st Place 
 2nd Greek Poker Championship - 1st Place 
 1st Greek Poker Championship - 1st Place 

Bouzalas attended the 2009 World Series of Poker Europe main event in London but never made it to the final table as Daniel Negreanu lost to Barry Shulman

In November 2009 Bouzalas covered the Card Player Magazine (Greece) which included his longest interview yet

Sources

External links 
 Poker statistics from The Hendon Mob

1982 births
Living people
People from Tripoli, Greece
Greek poker players